Porcelain tiles or ceramic tiles are porcelain or ceramic tiles commonly used to cover floors and walls, with a water absorption rate of less than 0.5 percent. The clay used to build porcelain tiles is generally denser. They can either be glazed or unglazed. Porcelain tiles are one type of vitrified tiles and are sometimes referred to as porcelain vitrified tiles.

Historically, porcelain was not the usual material for tiles, which were much more often made of earthenware (terracotta) or stoneware. The first porcelain tiles were made in China, for example in the 15th-century Porcelain Tower of Nanjing (now largely destroyed).  Here the tiles were used for walls, which long remained typical. In Europe, a few rooms were made in palaces of porcelain plaques, often with forms in high relief.  These were made by Capodimonte porcelain and Real Fábrica del Buen Retiro among others.
  
Although porcelain has now been widely used for making tiles for many years, modern production methods and quantities have made porcelain tiles available for the average householder in recent years.

Production
Large-scale production of  porcelain tile is undertaken in many countries, with the major producers being China, Italy, Morbi India, Spain and Turkey.  There are also countries undertaking small-scale production, such as Australia and strong growth in Brazil.

The wear rating of the tile can be graded from zero to five according to the ISO 10545-7 (also, ASTM C1027) test for surface abrasion resistance of glazed tile, and this can be used to determine suitability for various end-use conditions.

Polished porcelain tiles
The dense, hard surface of porcelain has made polishing a viable alternative to a glazed surface.  This means that a tile can be fired, then a polish cut into the surface, creating a shine without a glaze.

Use
Porcelain is much harder than ordinary ceramic tiles and is often selected, despite its higher price, for its hard-wearing nature. Porcelain can be used in both wet and dry areas such as bathrooms, showers, and kitchens.

Disadvantages
Porcelain is denser and therefore heavier to handle than other ceramic tiles. For this reason, it is generally more expensive. Being harder, it is more difficult to cut and drill and requires specialist tools, which can hamper fitting and increase costs. Polished porcelain may need sealing, where ordinary glazed tiles do not. The glazed surface is coated with less than two microns.

Cutting
There are several ways to cut a porcelain tile. Power tools like an angle grinder, tile cutter, tile nipper, the drill bit can be used to do this. However, the most effective way is to use a wet tile saw because of its versatility and cutting capacity.

Adhesives
Specialized cement is necessary for installation of porcelain tiles, and in the US specifications, are set by the Tile Council of America and supported by the Tile Contractors Association.
Porcelain, being denser and heavier than ordinary ceramic tiles, needs a stronger adhesive to hold the weight on walls.  Therefore, typical ready-mix adhesives are not recommended for porcelain.

Sealing
When porcelain is first made, it is not absorbent, but the polishing process for making the unglazed surface shiny cuts into the surface, leaving it more porous and prone to absorbing stains, in the same way as natural stone tiles.  Unless they have a suitable, long-lasting treatment applied by the manufacturer (for example, nanotech treatment), polished porcelain tiles may need sealing to make the maintenance of paving easier. Porcelain sealants are either solvent-based or water-based, which is cheaper but does not last.

Vitrification
Porcelain tiles can be vitrified to reduce their porosity and increase their strength. Vitrified porcelain tiles are created by combining clay with other elements such as quartz, silica, or feldspar under incredibly high temperatures. The vitrification process creates porcelain tiles that contain a glass substrate. The glass substrate gives the tiles a sleek appearance, provides added strength, and makes the tiles water and scratch-resistant. Vitrified porcelain tiles do not need to be re-sealed or glazed.

See also
Ceramic tile cutter

References 

Building materials
Visual arts materials
Porcelain
Ceramic materials
Tiling